The southern robust slider (Lerista picturata) is a species of skink found in Western Australia.

References

Lerista
Reptiles described in 1914
Taxa named by Dene Barrett Fry